The 2001 Pulitzer Prizes were announced on April 16, 2001.

Journalism awards

Letters awards
Fiction: 
The Amazing Adventures of Kavalier & Clay by Michael Chabon (Random House)
History:
Founding Brothers: The Revolutionary Generation by Joseph J. Ellis (Alfred A. Knopf)
Biography or Autobiography:
W.E.B. Du Bois: The Fight for Equality and the American Century, 1919-1963 by David Levering Lewis (Henry Holt and Company)
Poetry:
Different Hours by Stephen Dunn (W.W. Norton & Company)
General Non-Fiction
Hirohito and the Making of Modern Japan by Herbert P. Bix (HarperCollins)

Arts awards
Drama:
Proof by David Auburn (Faber and Faber)
Music:
Symphony No. 2 for String Orchestra by John Corigliano (G. Schirmer)- Premiered by the Boston Symphony Orchestra on November 30, 2000, at Symphony Hall, Boston

References

External links
 

Pulitzer Prizes by year
Pulitzer Prize
Pulitzer Prize
Pulitzer Prize